The Kampfgruppe gegen Unmenschlichkeit (KgU) (German for "Combat Group against Inhumanity") was a German anti-communist resistance group based in West Berlin. It was founded in 1948 by Rainer Hildebrandt, Günther Birkenfeld and Ernst Benda, and existed until 1959. Hildebrandt would later establish the Checkpoint Charlie Museum. It has been described as a terrorist group.

History
The KgU received significant financial support from several Western intelligence agencies as well as the government of West Germany and the Ford Foundation. The US Army's Counterintelligence Corps (CIC) provided funding from the group's creation in the late 1940s. By the early 1950s, the Central Intelligence Agency (CIA) gradually replaced the CIC as the KgU's most prominent American backer. According to CIA documents, the KgU ran approximately 500 agents in East Germany in the early 1950s, which, according to historian Enrico Heitzer, put it on par with the Gehlen Organization, the predecessor to the West German intelligence service Bundesnachrichtendienst.

The KgU's activities included sabotage, arson and poison attacks as well as aggressive economic warfare, such as Operation Osterhase ("Easter Bunny"), in which the group sent 150,000 fake letters to East German stores, ordering drastic price cuts in order to cause a run on already scarce consumer goods. Other activities included collecting data on individuals imprisoned in East Germany and passing it on to their relatives, as well as collecting names of informers to the East German government and passing it on to RIAS, which would then broadcast so-called "snitch reports" in order to silence informers and discourage others from engaging in similar activities. It also printed and distributed a satirical magazine, Tarantel, in East Germany.

The KgU also aided the CIA in building up a so-called stay-behind network to be used in the event of a hypothetical Soviet invasion. Infiltration of the KgU by Stasi operatives and the arrest of several of its agents in East Germany eventually caused the group to dissolve in 1959, with many of its records going to the CIA.

Although some KgU members, such as Rainer Hildebrandt and Ernst Tillich, had served time in prison during the Third Reich for anti-Nazi activities, as historian Enrico Heitzer points out, the group also used numerous activists with a Nazi past, many of whom hadn't changed their political views.

The KgU has been infiltrated by Stasi informants when the organization was still active.

Alleged terrorist activities in East Germany 
William Blum has alleged, based on various news articles from the 1950s, that the group carried out the following actions in East Germany:

 Engaging in industrial sabotage against power stations, factories, shipyards, canals, dams, gas stations, shops, public transport, public buildings, a dam and a radio station using methods including explosives, arson, short circuiting and contaminating machinery with sand and special acids.
 Engaging in sabotage against the transport infrastructure of East Germany, through methods such as derailing freight trains, destroying key equipment on freight trains, blowing up road and railway bridges, burning the cars of one freight train and in one case attempting to blow up bridge of the Berlin-Moscow railway line.
 Poisoning and killing 7000 cows in a dairy cooperative by poisoning the wax coating of the wire used to bale the cows corn fodder.
 Adding soap to powdered milk destined for East German schools
 Raided and attacked left-wing offices in West and East Berlin to steal membership lists, to assault leftists and in some cases to kidnap and murder them.
 Attempting to disrupt the World Youth Festival in East Berlin by sending out forged invitations, false promises of free bed and board, false notices of cancellations; carried out attacks on participants with explosives, firebombs, and tire-puncturing equipment; set fire to a wooden bridge on a main motorway leading to the festival.
 Attempting to cause chaos for economic planners by forging ration cards to cause shortages and confusion, forged tax notices and government directives to cause disorganization and inefficiency within industry and unions.

See also 

 Albanian Subversion
Bund Deutscher Jugend
 Contras
 Forest Brothers
 Luis Posada Carriles
 Omega 7
 Operation Cyclone
 Operation Gladio
 Operation Jungle
 Orlando Bosch

References

Bibliography
 

Anti-communist organizations
Anti-communism in Germany
West Berlin
Organisations based in Berlin
Cold War history of Germany
1950s in Berlin
1948 establishments in Germany
1959 disestablishments in Germany
Organizations established in 1948
Organizations disestablished in 1959
Anti-communist resistance movements in Eastern Europe